William Peagler (born April 27, 1985) is an American football coach and former player who is the assistant defensive line coach for the Arizona Cardinals of the National Football League (NFL).

Coaching career

Michigan State
On February 24, 2020, Peagler was hired as running backs coach for Michigan State.

References

External links
Michigan State Spartans bio

1985 births
Living people
People from Camp Lejeune, North Carolina
Michigan State Spartans football coaches
Colorado Buffaloes football coaches
Louisiana Ragin' Cajuns football coaches
Minnesota Golden Gophers football coaches
Valdosta State Blazers football coaches
Clemson Tigers football coaches
Players of American football from North Carolina
Coaches of American football from North Carolina